Soil water can refer to: 

Soil#Soil moisture - water in soil
Soil water (retention) - water-holding phenomenon inside soil
Blackwater (waste) - wastewater related to effluent from water closets, toilets and urinals